Kudroli Ganesh is an Indian magician.

Career
As a magician, Kudroli Ganesh has won many national and international awards including the first ever Illusion Magic Award. He has held more than 1500 shows in the country including 245 shows in schools.

Series
Vismaya (meaning: wonder), (completed 10 years as on October 2009)
Maya Spatikada Chamatkara (meaning: Magical sphere's wonder)

See also
Indian magicians
List of people from Karnataka

References

External links
 On Youtube

Living people
Indian magicians
Artists from Mangalore
Year of birth missing (living people)

http://www.kudroliganesh.com/